Total Fitness is a chain of health clubs in the UK, operated by Total Fitness Health Clubs Limited.

History
Total Fitness opened in 1993 after being established by Kwik Save founder Albert Gubay on the Isle of Man.  It was sold to the private equity arm of Legal & General in December 2004 for £80 million (€120 million). In 2015, Total Fitness was bought by North Edge Capital. Sophie Lawler joined Total Fitness in June 2018 as CEO.

Description
Total Fitness claims to be a mid-market health club brand in the North. It has 16 health clubs across the North of England and Wales. It claims a staff of 600 people and 80,000 members.

Total Fitness head office is based in Wilmslow within the Wilmslow Club, one of the well recognised health clubs in Europe.

References

External links
 Official website

Health clubs in the United Kingdom
Health care companies established in 1993